The Secret Lives of Dorks is a 2013 American independent comedy film directed by Salomé Breziner and starring Gaelan Connell, Vanessa Marano, Riley Voelkel, Beau Mirchoff and Jim Belushi.

Plot
Samantha, a dork, loves Payton, also a dork, who loves Carrie, a cheerleader, who dates Clark, the football captain. When Clark seeks out Payton for lessons about comic books, Payton sees a chance to be with Carrie, but Carrie wants to set Payton up with Samantha.

Cast
Gaelan Connell as Payton
Vanessa Marano as Samantha
Riley Voelkel as Carrie
Beau Mirchoff as Clark
Jim Belushi as Bronko
Jennifer Tilly as Ms. Stewart
William Katt as Mr. Thomas Gibson
Kay Lenz as Mrs. Susie Gibson
Seymour Cassel as Principal

Reception
On review aggregator Rotten Tomatoes, the film holds an approval rating of 11% based on 9 reviews, with an average rating of 3.91/10. On Metacritic, the film has a weighted average score of 32 out of 100, based on 7 critics, indicating "generally unfavorable reviews".

Noel Murray of The Dissolve and S. Jhoanna Robledo of Common Sense Media both awarded the film two stars out of five.  Mike D'Angelo of The A.V. Club graded it a C−.

Annlee Ellingson of the Los Angeles Times gave the film a positive review and wrote "...Johnny Severin and Nicholas David Brandt's otherwise clever and original script takes an unexpected turn at nearly every intersection, resulting in a funny and big-hearted coming-of-age romance."

References

External links
 
 

American comedy films
American independent films
Films directed by Salomé Breziner
2010s English-language films
2010s American films